Smithtown Christian School is a private school in Smithtown, New York. It was established in 1978 and has students from preschool through twelfth grade.

References

Christian schools in New York (state)
Nondenominational Christian schools in the United States
Educational institutions established in 1978
Christian School
Schools in Suffolk County, New York
Private elementary schools in New York (state)
Private middle schools in New York (state)
Private high schools in New York (state)